The 1984 Anti-Sikh Riots, also known as the 1984 Sikh Massacre, was a series of organised pogroms against Sikhs in India following the assassination of Indira Gandhi by her Sikh bodyguards. Government estimates project that about 2,800 Sikhs were killed in Delhi and 3,350 nationwide, whilst independent sources estimate the number of deaths at about 8,000–17,000.

The assassination of Indira Gandhi itself had taken place shortly after she had ordered Operation Blue Star, a military action to secure the Harmandir Sahib Sikh temple complex in Amritsar, Punjab, in June 1984. The operation had resulted in a deadly battle with armed Sikh groups who were demanding greater rights and autonomy for Punjab and the deaths of many pilgrims. Sikhs worldwide had criticized the army action and many saw it as an assault on their religion and identity.

In the aftermath of the pogroms, the government reported that 20,000 had fled the city; the People's Union for Civil Liberties reported "at least" 1,000 displaced persons. The most-affected regions were the Sikh neighbourhoods of Delhi. Human rights organisations and newspapers across India believed that the massacre was organised. The collusion of political officials connected to the Indian National Congress in the violence and judicial failure to penalise the perpetrators alienated Sikhs and increased support for the Khalistan movement. The Akal Takht, Sikhism's governing body, considers the killings a genocide.

In 2011, Human Rights Watch reported that the Government of India had "yet to prosecute those responsible for the mass killings". According to the 2011 WikiLeaks cable leaks, the United States was convinced of Indian National Congress' complicity in the riots and called it "opportunism" and "hatred" by the Congress government, of Sikhs. Although the U.S. has not identified the riots as genocide, it acknowledged that "grave human rights violations" occurred. In 2011, the burned sites of multiple Sikh killings from 1984, were discovered in Hondh-Chillar and Pataudi areas of Haryana. The Central Bureau of Investigation, the main Indian investigative agency, believes that the violence was organised with support from the Delhi police and some central-government officials.

After 34 years of delay, in December 2018, the first high-profile conviction for the 1984 anti-Sikh riots took place with the arrest of Congress leader Sajjan Kumar, who was sentenced to life imprisonment by the Delhi High Court. Very few convictions have taken place in the pending 1984 cases, with only one death penalty conviction for an accused, Yashpal in the case of murdering Sikhs in the Mahipalpur area of Delhi.

Background 

In 1972 Punjab state elections, Congress won and Akali Dal was defeated. In 1973, Akali Dal put forward the Anandpur Sahib Resolution to demand more autonomy to Punjab. It demanded that power be generally devolved from the Central to state governments. The Congress government considered the resolution a secessionist document and rejected it. Jarnail Singh Bhindranwale, a prominent Sikh leader of Damdami Taksal, then joined the Akali Dal to launch the Dharam Yudh Morcha in 1982 to implement the Anandpur Sahib resolution. Bhindranwale had risen to prominence in the Sikh political circle with his policy of getting the Anandpur Resolution passed. Others demanded an autonomous state in India, based on the Anandpur Sahib Resolution.

As high-handed police methods normally used on common criminals were used on protesters during the Dharam Yudh Morcha, creating state repression affecting a very large segment of Punjab's population, retaliatory violence came from a section of the Sikh population, widening the scope of the conflict by the use of violence of the state on its own people, creating fresh motives for Sikh youth to turn to insurgency. The concept of Khalistan was still vague even while the complex was fortified under the influence of former Sikh army officials alienated by government actions who now advised Bhindranwale, Major General Shabeg Singh and retired Major General and Brigadier Mohinder Singh, and at that point the concept was still not directly connected with the movement he headed. In other parts of Punjab, a "state of chaos and repressive police methods" combined to create "a mood of overwhelming anger and resentment in the Sikh masses against the authorities," making Bhindranwale even more popular, and demands of independence gain currency, even amongst moderates and Sikh intellectuals.

By 1983, the situation in Punjab was volatile. In October, Sikh militants stopped a bus and shot six Hindu passengers. On the same day, another group killed two officials on a train. The Congress-led central government dismissed the Punjab state government (led by their party), invoking the president's rule. During the five months before Operation Blue Star, from 1 January to 3 June 1984, 298 people were killed in violent incidents across Punjab. In the five days preceding the operation, 48 people were killed by violence. According to government  estimates, the number of civilians, police, and militants killed was 27 in 1981, 22 in 1982, and 99 in 1983. By June 1984, the total number of deaths was 410 in violent incidents and riots while 1,180 people were injured.

On 1 June, Operation Blue Star was launched to remove him and the armed militants from the Golden Temple complex. On 6 June Bhindranwale died in the operation. Casualty figures for the Army were 83 dead and 249 injured. According to the official estimate presented by the Indian government, 1592 were apprehended and there were 493 combined militant and civilian casualties. Later operations by Indian paramilitary forces were conducted to clear the separatists from the state of Punjab.

The operation carried out in the temple caused outrage among the Sikhs and increased the support for Khalistan Movement. Four months after the operation, on 31 October 1984, Indira Gandhi was assassinated in vengeance by her two Sikh bodyguards, Satwant Singh and Beant Singh. One of the assassins was fatally shot by Gandhi's other bodyguards while the other was convicted of Gandhi's murder and then executed. Public outcry over Gandhi's death led to the killings of Sikhs in the ensuing 1984 anti-Sikh riots.

Violence 

After the assassination of Indira Gandhi on 31 October 1984 by two of her Sikh bodyguards, anti-Sikh riots erupted the following day. They continued in some areas for several days, killing more than 3,000 Sikhs in New Delhi and an estimated 8,000 – 17,000 Sikhs in total were killed across 40 cities in India. At least 50,000 Sikhs were displaced. Sultanpuri, Mangolpuri, Trilokpuri, and other Trans-Yamuna areas of Delhi were the worst affected. Perpetrators carried iron rods, knives, clubs, and combustible material (including kerosene and petrol). They entered Sikh neighbourhoods, killing Sikhs indiscriminately and destroying shops and houses. Armed mobs stopped buses and trains in and near Delhi, pulling off Sikh passengers for lynching; some were burnt alive. Others were dragged from their homes and hacked to death, and Sikh women were reportedly gang-raped and Sikhs also had acid thrown on them.

The riots have also been described as pogroms, massacres or genocide.

Meetings and weapons distribution 

On 31 October, a crowd around the All India Institute of Medical Sciences began shouting vengeance slogans such as "Blood for blood!" and became an unruly mob. At 17:20, President Zail Singh arrived at the hospital and the mob stoned his car. The mob began assaulting Sikhs, stopping cars and buses to pull Sikhs out and burn them. The violence on 31 October, restricted to the area around the AIIMS, resulted in many Sikh deaths. Residents of other parts of Delhi reported that their neighbourhoods were peaceful.

During the night of 31 October and the morning of 1 November, Congress Party leaders met with local supporters to distribute money and weapons. Congress MP Sajjan Kumar and trade-union leader Lalit Maken handed out  notes and bottles of liquor to the assailants. On the morning of 1 November, Sajjan Kumar was observed holding rallies in the Delhi neighbourhoods of Palam Colony (from 06:30 to 07:00), Kiran Gardens (08:00 to 08:30), and Sultanpuri (about 08:30 to 09:00). In Kiran Gardens at 8:00 am, Kumar was observed distributing iron rods from a parked truck to a group of 120 people and ordering them to "attack Sikhs, kill them, and loot and burn their properties". During the morning he led a mob along the Palam railway road to Mangolpuri, where the crowd chanted: "Kill the Sardars" and "Indira Gandhi is our mother and these people have killed her". In Sultanpuri, Moti Singh (a Sikh Congress Party member for 20 years) heard Kumar make the following speech:

The Central Bureau of Investigation told the court that during the riot, Kumar said that "not a single Sikh should survive". The bureau accused Delhi police of keeping its "eyes closed" during the riot, which was planned.

In the Shakarpur neighbourhood, Congress Party leader Shyam Tyagi's home was used as a meeting place for an undetermined number of people. Minister of Information and Broadcasting H. K. L. Bhagat gave money to Boop Tyagi (Tyagi's brother), saying: "Keep these two thousand rupees for liquor and do as I have told you ... You need not worry at all. I will look after everything."

During the night of 31 October, Balwan Khokhar (a local Congress Party leader who was implicated in the massacre) held a meeting at Pandit Harkesh's ration shop in Palam. Congress Party supporter Shankar Lal Sharma held a meeting, where he assembled a mob which swore to kill Sikhs, in his shop at 08:30 on 1 November.

Kerosene, the primary mob weapon, was supplied by a group of Congress Party leaders who owned filling stations. In Sultanpuri, Congress Party A-4 block president Brahmanand Gupta distributed oil while Sajjan Kumar "instructed the crowd to kill Sikhs, and to loot and burn their properties" (as he had done at other meetings throughout New Delhi). Similar meetings were held at locations such as Cooperative Colony in Bokaro, where local Congress president and gas-station owner P. K. Tripathi distributed kerosene to mobs. Aseem Shrivastava, a graduate student at the Delhi School of Economics, described the mobs' organised nature in an affidavit submitted to the Misra Commission:

A senior official at the Ministry of Home Affairs told journalist Ivan Fera that an arson investigation of several businesses burned in the riots had found an unnamed combustible chemical "whose provision required large-scale coordination". Eyewitness reports confirmed the use of a combustible chemical in addition to kerosene. The Delhi Sikh Gurdwara Management Committee later cited 70 affidavits noting the use of a highly-flammable chemical in its written reports to the Misra Commission.

Congress Party voter-list use 

On 31 October, Congress Party officials provided assailants with voter lists, school registration forms, and ration lists. The lists were used to find Sikh homes and business, an otherwise-impossible task because they were in unmarked, diverse neighbourhoods. During the night of 31 October, before the massacres began, assailants used the lists to mark Sikh houses with an "S". Because most mob members were illiterate, Congress Party officials provided help reading the lists and leading the mobs to Sikh homes and businesses in other neighbourhoods. With the lists, the mobs could pinpoint the location of Sikhs they otherwise would have missed.

Sikh men not at home were easily identified by their turbans and beards, and Sikh women were identified by their dress. In some cases, the mobs returned to locations where they knew Sikhs were hiding because of the lists. Amar Singh escaped the initial attack on his house by having a Hindu neighbour drag him into the neighbour's house and announce that he was dead. A group of 18 assailants later came looking for his body; when his neighbour said that his body had been taken away, an assailant showed him a list and said: "Look, Amar Singh's name has not been struck off from the list, so his body has not been taken away."

Timeline

31 October 

 09:20: Indira Gandhi is shot by two of her Sikh security guards at her residence, and is rushed to the All India Institute of Medical Sciences (AIIMS).
 10:50: Gandhi dies.
 11:00: All India Radio reports that the guards who shot Gandhi were Sikhs.
 16:00: Rajiv Gandhi returns from West Bengal to the AIIMS, where isolated attacks occur.
 17:30: The motorcade of President Zail Singh, returning from a foreign visit, is stoned as it approaches the AIIMS.

Evening and night 

 Organized, equipped gangs fan out from the AIIMS.
 Violence towards Sikhs and destruction of Sikh property spreads.
 Rajiv Gandhi is sworn in as Prime Minister.
 Senior advocate and BJP leader Ram Jethmalani meets Home Minister P. V. Narasimha Rao and urges him to take immediate steps to protect Sikhs from further attacks.
 Delhi lieutenant governor P. G. Gavai and police commissioner S. C. Tandon visit affected areas.

1 November 

 The first Sikh is killed in East Delhi.
 09:00: Armed mobs take over the streets in Delhi. Gurdwaras are among the first targets. The worst-affected areas are low-income neighbourhoods such as Inderlok (erstwhile Trilokpuri), Shahdara, Geeta Colony, Mongolpuri, Sultanpuri and Palam Colony. Areas with prompt police intervention, such as Farsh Bazar and Karol Bagh, see few killings and little major violence.

2 November 

A curfew is announced in Delhi, but is not enforced. Although the army is deployed throughout the city, the police did not co-operate with soldiers (who are forbidden to fire without the consent of senior police officers and executive magistrates).

3 November 

By late evening, army and local police units work together to subdue the violence. After law-enforcement intervention, violence is comparatively mild and sporadic. In Delhi, the bodies of riot victims are brought to the All India Institute of Medical Sciences and the Civil Hospital mortuary in Delhi.

Aftermath 

The Delhi High Court, delivering its verdict on a riot-related case in 2009, said:

The government allegedly destroyed evidence and shielded the guilty. Asian Age, an Indian daily newspaper, ran a front-page story calling the government actions "the mother of all cover-ups".

From 31 October 1984 to 10 November 1984 the People's Union for Democratic Rights and the People's Union for Civil Liberties conducted an inquiry into the riots, interviewing victims, police officers, neighbours of the victims, army personnel and political leaders. In their joint report, "Who Are The Guilty", the groups concluded:
 The attacks on members of the Sikh Community in Delhi and its suburbs during the period, far from being a spontaneous expression of "madness" and of popular "grief and anger" at Mrs. Gandhi's assassination as made out to be by the authorities, were the outcome of a well organised plan marked by acts of both deliberate commissions and omissions by important politicians of the Congress (I) at the top and by authorities in the administration. 

According to eyewitness accounts obtained by Time magazine, Delhi police looked on as "rioters murdered and raped, having gotten access to voter records that allowed them to mark Sikh homes with large Xs, and large mobs being bused in to large Sikh settlements". Time reported that the riots led to only minor arrests, with no major politicians or police officers convicted. The magazine quoted Ensaaf, an Indian human-rights organisation, as saying that the government attempted to destroy evidence of its involvement by refusing to record First Information Reports.

A 1991 Human Rights Watch report on violence between Sikh separatists and the Government of India traced part of the problem to government response to the violence:

Despite numerous credible eye-witness accounts that identified many of those involved in the violence, including police and politicians, in the months following the killings, the government sought no prosecutions or indictments of any persons, including officials, accused in any case of murder, rape or arson.

The violence was allegedly led (and often perpetrated) by Indian National Congress activists and sympathizers. The Congress-led government was widely criticised for doing little at the time and possibly conspiring in the riots, since voter lists were used to identify Sikh families.

A few days after the massacre, many surviving Sikh youths in Delhi had joined or created Sikh militant groups. This led to more violence in Punjab, including the assassination of several senior Congress Party members. The Khalistan Commando Force and Khalistan Liberation Force claimed responsibility for the retaliation, and an underground network was established.

On 31 July 1985, Harjinder Singh Jinda, Sukhdev Singh Sukha and Ranjit Singh Gill of the Khalistan Commando Force assassinated Congress Party leader and MP Lalit Maken in retaliation for the riots. The 31-page report, "Who Are The Guilty?", listed 227 people who led the mobs; Maken was third on the list.

Harjinder Singh Jinda and Sukhdev Singh Sukha assassinated Congress Party leader Arjan Dass because of his involvement in the riots. Dass' name appeared in affidavits submitted by Sikh victims to the Nanavati Commission, headed by retired Supreme Court of India judge G. T. Nanavati.

Convictions 

In Delhi, 442 rioters were convicted. Forty-nine were sentenced to the life imprisonment, and another three to more than 10 years' imprisonment. Six Delhi police officers were sanctioned for negligence during the riots. In April 2013, the Supreme Court of India dismissed the appeal of three people who had challenged their life sentences. That month, the Karkardooma district court in Delhi convicted five people – Balwan Khokkar (former councillor), Mahender Yadav (former MLA), Kishan Khokkar, Girdhari Lal and Captain Bhagmal – for inciting a mob against Sikhs in Delhi Cantonment. The court acquitted Congress leader Sajjan Kumar, which led to protests.

In the first ever case of capital punishment in the 1984 anti-Sikh riots case death sentence was awarded to Yashpal Singh convicted for murdering two persons, 24-year-old Hardev Singh and 26-year-old Avtar Singh, in Mahipal Pur area of Delhi on 1 November 1984. Additional Sessions Judge Ajay Pandey pronounced the Judgement on 20 November 34 years after the crime was committed. The second convict in the case, Naresh Sehrawat was awarded life imprisonment. The Court considered the failing health of 68-year-old Sehrawat while giving him a lighter sentence. The conviction followed a complaint by the deceased Hardev Singh's elder brother Santokh Singh. Though an FIR was filed on the same day of the crime nothing came of the case as a Congress leader, JP Singh, who led the mob was acquitted in the case. A fresh FIR was filed on 29 April 1993, following recommendations of the Ranganath Commission of inquiry. The police closed the matter as untraced despite witness testimonies of the deceased's four brothers who were witness to the crime. The case was reopened by the Special Investigation Team constituted by the BJP-led NDA government on 12 February 2015. The SIT completed the investigation in record time. The first conviction resulting from the formation of the SIT came on 15 November 2018, by the conviction of Naresh Sehrawat and Yashpal Singh.

In December 2018, in one of the first high-profile convictions, former Congress leader Sajjan Kumar was sentenced to life imprisonment by the Delhi High Court based on the re-opened investigation by the Special Investigation Team constituted by the NDA government in 2015.

Investigations 

Ten commissions or committees have been formed to investigate the riots. The most recent, headed by Justice G. T. Nanavati, submitted its 185-page report to Home Minister Shivraj Patil on 9 February 2005; the report was tabled in Parliament on 8 August of that year. The commissions below are listed in chronological order. Many of the accused were acquitted or never formally charged.

Marwah Commission 

The Marwah Commission was appointed in November 1984. Ved Marwah, Additional Commissioner of Police, was tasked with enquiring into the role of the police during the riots. Many of the accused Delhi Police officers were tried in the Delhi High Court. As Marwah was completing his inquiry in mid-1985, he was abruptly directed by the Home Ministry not to proceed further. The Marwah Commission records were appropriated by the government, and most (except for Marwah's handwritten notes) were later given to the Misra Commission.

Misra Commission 

The Misra Commission was appointed in May 1985; Justice Rangnath Misra was a judge on the Supreme Court of India. Misra submitted his report in August 1986, and the report was made public in February 1987. In his report, he said that it was not part of his terms of reference to identify any individual and recommended the formation of three committees.

The commission and its report was criticised as biased by the People's Union for Civil Liberties and Human Rights Watch. According to a Human Rights Watch report on the commission:

It recommended no criminal prosecution of any individual, and it cleared all high-level officials of directing the pogroms. In its findings, the commission did acknowledge that many of the victims testifying before it had received threats from local police. While the commission noted that there had been "widespread lapses" on the part of the police, it concluded that "the allegations before the commission about the conduct of the police are more of indifference and negligence during the riots than of any wrongful overt act."

The People's Union for Civil Liberties criticised the Misra Commission for concealing information on the accused while disclosing the names and addresses of victims.

Kapur Mittal Committee 

The Kapur Mittal Committee was appointed in February 1987 at the recommendation of the Misra Commission to enquire into the role of the police; the Marwah Commission had almost completed a police inquiry in 1985 when the government asked that committee not to continue. This committee consisted of Justice Dalip Kapur and Kusum Mittal, retired Secretary of Uttar Pradesh. It submitted its report in 1990, and 72 police officers were cited for conspiracy or gross negligence. Although the committee recommended the dismissal of 30 of the 72 officers, none have been punished.

Jain Banerjee Committee 

The Jain Banerjee Committee was recommended by the Misra Commission for the registration of cases. The committee consisted of former Delhi High Court judge M. L. Jain and retired Inspector General of Police A. K. Banerjee.

In its report, the Misra Commission stated that many cases (particularly those involving political leaders or police officers) had not been registered. Although the Jain Banerjee Committee recommended the registration of cases against Sajjan Kumar in August 1987, no case was registered.

In November 1987, press reports criticised the government for not registering cases despite the committee's recommendation. The following month, Brahmanand Gupta (accused with Sajjan Kumar) filed a writ petition in the Delhi High Court and obtained a stay of proceedings against the committee which was not opposed by the government. The Citizen's Justice Committee filed an application to vacate the stay. The writ petition was decided in August 1989 and the high court abolished the committee. An appeal was filed by the Citizen's Justice Committee in the Supreme Court of India.

Potti Rosha Committee 

The Potti Rosha Committee was appointed in March 1990 by the V. P. Singh government as a successor to the Jain Banerjee Committee. In August 1990, the committee issued recommendations for filing cases based on affidavits submitted by victims of the violence; there was one against Sajjan Kumar. When a CBI team went to Kumar's home to file the charges, his supporters held and threatened them if they persisted in pursuing Kumar. When the committee's term expired in September 1990, Potti and Rosha decided to end their inquiry.

Jain Aggarwal Committee 

The Jain Aggarwal Committee was appointed in December 1990 as a successor to the Potti Rosha Committee. It consisted of Justice J. D. Jain and retired Uttar Pradesh director general of police D. K. Aggarwal. The committee recommended the registration of cases against H. K. L. Bhagat, Sajjan Kumar, Dharamdas Shastri and Jagdish Tytler.

It suggested establishing two or three special investigating teams in the Delhi Police under a deputy commissioner of police, supervised by an additional commissioner of police answerable to the CID, and a review of the work-load of the three special courts set up to deal with the riot cases. The appointment of special prosecutors to deal the cases was also discussed. The committee was wound up in August 1993, but the cases it recommended were not registered by the police.

Ahuja Committee 

The Ahuja Committee was the third committee recommended by the Misra Commission to determine the total number of deaths in Delhi. According to the committee, which submitted its report in August 1987, 2,733 Sikhs were killed in the city.

Dhillon Committee 

The Dhillon Committee, headed by Gurdial Singh Dhillon, was appointed in 1985 to recommend measures for the rehabilitation of victims. The committee submitted its report by the end of the year. One major recommendation was that businesses with insurance coverage whose claims were denied should receive compensation as directed by the government. Although the committee recommended ordering the (nationalised) insurance companies to pay the claims, the government did not accept its recommendation and the claims were not paid.

Narula Committee 

The Narula Committee was appointed in December 1993 by the Madan Lal Khurana-led BJP government in Delhi. One recommendation of the committee was to convince the central government to impose sanctions.

Khurana took up the matter with the central government, which in the middle of 1994, the Central Government decided that the matter did not fall within its purview and sent the case to the lieutenant governor of Delhi. It took two years for the P. V. Narasimha Rao government to decide that it did not fall within its purview.

The Narasimha Rao Government further delayed the case. The committee submitted its report in January 1994, recommending the registration of cases against H. K. L. Bhagat and Sajjan Kumar. Despite the central-government delay, the CBI filed the charge sheet in December 1994.

The Nanavati Commission 

The Nanavati Commission was established in 2000 after some dissatisfaction was expressed with previous reports. The Nanavati Commission was appointed by a unanimous resolution passed in the Rajya Sabha. This commission was headed by Justice G.T. Nanavati, retired Judge of the Supreme Court of India. The commission submitted its report in February 2004. The commission reported that recorded accounts from victims and witnesses "indicate that local Congress leaders and workers had either incited or helped the mobs in attacking the Sikhs". Its report also found evidence against Jagdish Tytler "to the effect that very probably he had a hand in organising attacks on Sikhs". It also recommended that Sajjan Kumar's involvement in the rioting required a closer look. The commission's report also cleared Rajiv Gandhi and other high ranking Congress (I) party members of any involvement in organising riots against Sikhs. It did find, however, that the Delhi Police fired about 392 rounds of bullets, arrested approximately 372 persons, and "remained passive and did not provide protection to the people" throughout the rioting.

Role of Jagdish Tytler 

The Central Bureau of Investigation closed all cases against Jagdish Tytler in November 2007 for his alleged criminal conspiracy to engineer riots against Sikhs in the aftermath of Indira Gandhi's assassination. The bureau submitted a report to the Delhi court that no evidence or witness was found to corroborate allegations that Tytler led murderous mobs during 1984. It was alleged in court that Tytler – then an MP – complained to his supporters about the relatively-"small" number of Sikhs killed in his constituency (Delhi Sadar), which he thought had undermined his position in the Congress Party.

In December 2007 a witness, Dushyant Singh (then living in California), appeared on several private television news channels in India saying that he was never contacted by the CBI. The opposition Bharatiya Janata Party (BJP) demanded an explanation in Parliament from Minister of State for Personnel Suresh Pachouri, who was in charge of the CBI. Pachouri, who was present, refused to make a statement. Additional Chief Metropolitan Magistrate of the Delhi Court Sanjeev Jain, who had dismissed the case against Tytler after the CBI submitted a misleading report, ordered the CBI to reopen cases against Tytler related to the riots on 18 December 2007.

In December 2008 a two-member CBI team went to New York to record statements from Jasbir Singh and Surinder Singh, two eyewitnesses. The witnesses said that they saw Tytler lead a mob during the riot, but did not want to return to India because they feared for their safety. They blamed the CBI for not conducting a fair trial, accusing the bureau of protecting Tytler.

In March 2009, the CBI cleared Tytler amidst protests from Sikhs and the opposition parties. On 7 April, Sikh Dainik Jagran reporter Jarnail Singh threw his shoe at Home Minister P. Chidambaram to protest the clearing of Tytler and Sajjan Kumar. Because of the upcoming Lok Sabha elections, Chidambaram did not press charges.

Two days later, over 500 protesters from Sikh organisations throughout India gathered outside the court which was scheduled to hear the CBI's plea to close the case against Tytler. Later in the day, Tytler announced that he was withdrawing from the Lok Sabha elections to avoid embarrassing his party. This forced the Congress Party to cut the Tytler and Sajjan Kumar Lok Sabha tickets.

On 10 April 2013, the Delhi court ordered the CBI to reopen the 1984 case against Tytler. The court ordered the bureau to investigate the killing of three people in the riot case, of which Tytler had been cleared. In 2015, Delhi Court directed the CBI to include Billionaire arms dealer Abhishek Verma as the main witness in this case against Tytler. Following court's directions, Verma's testimony was recorded by the CBI and the case was reopened. Polygraph (lie-detector) test was ordered by the court to be conducted on witness Verma and also on Tytler after obtaining their consent. Verma consented, Tytler declined to be tested. Thereafter, Verma started to receive threat calls and letters in which he was threatened to be blownup and his family also would be blown up if he testifies against Tytler. The Delhi High Court directed Delhi Police to provide 3x3 security cover of 9 armed police bodyguards to Verma and his family on round the clock basis.

New York civil case 

Sikhs for Justice, a U.S.-based NGO, filed a civil suit in the United States District Court for the Southern District of New York on 14 March 2011 accusing the Indian government of complicity in the riots. The court issued a summons to the Congress Party and Kamal Nath, who was accused by the Nanavati commission of encouraging rioters. The complaint against Nath was dismissed in March 2012 by Judge Robert W. Sweet, who ruled that the court lacked jurisdiction in the case. The 22-page order granted Nath's motion to dismiss the claim, with Sweet noting that Sikhs for Justice failed to "serve the summons and its complaints to Nath in an appropriate and desired manner". On 3 September 2013, a federal court in New York issued a summons to Sonia Gandhi for her alleged role in protecting participants in the riots. A U.S. court dismissed the lawsuit against Gandhi on 11 July 2014.

Cobrapost operation 

According to an April 2014 Cobrapost sting operation, the government muzzled the Delhi Police during the riots. Messages were broadcast directing the police not to act against rioters, and the fire brigade would not go to areas where cases of arson were reported.

Special Investigation Team (Supreme Court) 

In January 2018, the Supreme Court of India decided to form a three-member Special Investigation Team (SIT) of its own to probe 186 cases related to 1984 anti-Sikh riots that were not further investigated by Union Government formed SIT. This SIT would consists of a former High court judge, a former IPS officer whose rank is not less than or equivalent to Inspector general and a serving IPS Officer.

Impact and legacy 

On 12 August 2005, Manmohan Singh apologised in the Lok Sabha for the riots. The riots are cited as a reason to support the creation of a Sikh homeland in India, often called Khalistan.

Many Indians of different religions made significant efforts to hide and help Sikh families during the rioting. The Sikh Jathedar of Akal Takht declared the events following the death of Indira Gandhi a Sikh "genocide", replacing "anti-Sikh riots" widely used by the Indian government, the media and writers, on 15 July 2010. The decision came soon after a similar motion was raised in the Canadian Parliament by Sukh Dhaliwal, a Sikh MP.

On 16 April 2015, Assembly Concurrent Resolution 34 (ACR 34) was passed by the California State Assembly. Co-authored by Sacramento-area assembly members Jim Cooper, Kevin McCarty, Jim Gallagher and Ken Cooley, the resolution criticized the Government for participating in and failing to prevent the killings. The assembly called the killings a "genocide", as it "resulted in the intentional destruction of many Sikh families, communities, homes and businesses." In April 2017, the Ontario Legislature passed a motion condemning the anti-Sikh riots as "genocide". The Indian government lobbied against the motion and condemned it upon its adoption. In February 2018, American state of Connecticut, passed a bill stating, 30 November of each year to be "Sikh Genocide" Remembrance Day to remember the lives lost on 30 November 1984, during the Sikh Genocide.

On 15 January 2017, the Wall of Truth was inaugurated in Lutyens' Delhi, New Delhi, as a memorial for Sikhs killed during the 1984 riots (and other hate crimes across the world).

In popular culture 

The anti-Sikh riots have been the subject of several films and novels:

 The 2022 Netflix movie Jogi, starring Diljit Dosanjh, directed by Ali Abbas Zafar, is set against the backdrop of the 1984 anti-Sikh riots in Trilokpuri, Delhi.  It tells the story of a Sikh man named Jogi whose goal is to save his family, friends and fellow neighbours from a massacre that killed thousands of Sikhs. 
 The 2021 web television series Grahan, starring Pavan Malhotra, Wamiqa Gabbi, and Zoya Hussain, and created by Shailendra Kumar Jha and directed by Ranjan Chandel, for Hotstar, is inspired by Satya Vyas’ popular novel Chaurasi. It is the first series to deal with the 1984 anti-Sikh riots happended in Bokaro, Jharkhand. The series is centered on the nexus between politics and law enforcement.
 The 2005 English film Amu, by Shonali Bose and starring Konkona Sen Sharma and Brinda Karat, is based on Shonali Bose's novel of the same name. The film tells the story of a girl, orphaned during the riots, who reconciles with her adoption years later. Although it won the National Film Award for Best Feature Film in English, it was censored in India but was released on DVD without the cuts.
 The 2004 Hindi film Kaya Taran (Chrysalis), directed by Shashi Kumar and starring Seema Biswas, is based on the Malayalam short story "When Big Tree Falls" by N.S. Madhavan. The film revolves around a Sikh woman and her young son, who took shelter in a Meerut nunnery during the riots.
 The 2003 Bollywood film Hawayein, a project of Babbu Maan and Ammtoje Mann, is based on the aftermath of Indira Gandhi's assassination, the 1984 riots and the subsequent victimisation of the Punjabi people.
 Mamoni Raisom Goswami's Assamese novel, Tej Aru Dhulire Dhusarita Prishtha (Pages Stained with Blood), focuses on the riots.
 Khushwant Singh and Kuldip Nayar's book, Tragedy of Punjab: Operation Bluestar & After, focuses on the events surrounding the riots.
 Jarnail Singh's non-fiction book, I Accuse, describes incidents which occurred during the riots.
 Uma Chakravarthi and Nandita Hakser's book, The Delhi Riots: Three Days in the Life of a Nation, has interviews with victims of the Delhi riots.
 H. S. Phoolka and human-rights activist and journalist Manoj Mitta wrote the first account of the riots, When a Tree Shook Delhi.
 HELIUM (a novel of 1984, published by Bloomsbury in 2013) by Jaspreet Singh]
 The 2014 Punjabi film, Punjab 1984 with Diljit Dosanjh, is based on the aftermath of Indira Gandhi's assassination, the riots and the subsequent victimisation of the Punjabi people.
 The 2016 Bollywood film, 31st October with Vir Das, is based on the riots.
 The 2016 Punjabi film, Dharam Yudh Morcha, is based on the riots.
 The 2001 Star Trek novel The Eugenics Wars: The Rise and Fall of Khan Noonien Singh by Gary Cox, a 14-year-old Khan, who is depicted as a North Indian from a family of Sikhs, is caught up in the riots while reading in a used book stall in Nai Sarak. He is injured, doused with kerosene and nearly set on fire by a mob before being rescued by Gary Seven.

See also 

 Black July (1985)
 Nellie massacre (1983)
 Operation Blue Star (1984)
 List of massacres in India
 Air India Flight 182
 Violence against Sikhs in Pakistan

Notes

References

Further reading 

 Pav Singh. 1984 India's Guilty Secret. (Rupa & Kashi House 2017).
 
 
 Cynthia Keppley Mahmood. Fighting for Faith and Nation: Dialogues With Sikh Militants. University of Pennsylvania Press, .
 Ram Narayan Kumar et al. Reduced to Ashes: The Insurgency and Human Rights in Punjab.South Asia Forum for Human Rights, 2003.
 Joyce Pettigrew. The Sikhs of the Punjab: Unheard Voices of State and Guerrilla Violence. Zed Books Ltd., 1995.
 Anurag Singh. Giani Kirpal Singh’s Eye-Witness Account of Operation Bluestar. 1999.
 Patwant Singh. The Sikhs. New York: Knopf, 2000.
 Harnik Deol. Religion and Nationalism in India: The Case of the Punjab. London: Routledge, 2000
 Mark Tully. Amritsar: Mrs Gandhi's Last Battle. .
 Ranbir Singh Sandhu. Struggle for Justice: Speeches and Conversations of Sant Jarnail Singh Bhindranwale. Ohio: SERF, 1999.
 Iqbal Singh. Punjab Under Siege: A Critical Analysis. New York: Allen, McMillan and Enderson, 1986.
 Paul Brass. Language, Religion and Politics in North India. Cambridge: Cambridge University Press, 1974.
 PUCL report "Who Are The Guilty." Link to report.
 Manoj Mitta & H.S. Phoolka. When a Tree Shook Delhi (Roli Books, 2007), .
 Jarnail Singh, 'I Accuse...' (Penguin Books India, 2009), 
 Jyoti Grewal, 'Betrayed by the state: the anti-Sikh pogrom of 1984' (Penguin Books India, 2007),

External links 

 1984 Anti-Sikh Riots Homepage  at Times of India
 1984 riots case records, Government of Delhi
 Misra Commission Report
 Ahooja Committee Report
 Who Are The Guilty?
 In pictures: Massacre of the Sikhs

 
1984 crimes in India
1984 riots
1980s in Delhi
1984 murders in India
20th-century mass murder in India
Assassination of Indira Gandhi
Attacks on religious buildings and structures in India
History of the Indian National Congress
Sexual violence at riots and crowd disturbances
History of Delhi (1947–present)
History of Punjab, India (1947–present)
Indian National Congress
Ethnic conflict
Ethnic cleansing
Ethnic cleansing in Asia
Genocides in Asia
Genocidal rape
Massacres in India
Massacres in 1984
Massacres of Sikhs
October 1984 crimes
October 1984 events in Asia
November 1984 crimes
November 1984 events in Asia
Riots and civil disorder in India
Pogroms
Persecution of Sikhs